Gojan Station is a commuter train station on Seoul Subway Line 4 in Ansan, Korea. It is the closest station to Ansan Wa~ Stadium. Its station subname is Korea Univ. Ansan Hospital, as it is located nearby the station. The word "Gojan" originated as "inside of cape".

Station layout

Vicinity

Exit 1 : Ansan City Hall, Ansan Wa~ Stadium, Ansan Arts Center, Korea University Ansan Hospital
Exit 2 : Jinheung Elementary School

History
Gojan Station was at first a station of the Suin line.
August 5, 1937: new station of Suin Line.
April 10, 1969: change from not arrangement whistle stop to arrangement whistle stop.
March 2, 1992: opening of the Ansan Line.
April 1, 1994: opening of direct subway (Seoul Subway Line 4 – Gwacheon Station)
September 1, 1994: closing of Suin Line station

References

Metro stations in Ansan
Seoul Metropolitan Subway stations
Railway stations opened in 1937